The following is a list of members of the Revolutionary Command Council under Ahmed Hassan al-Bakr. The tables are ordered after the Iraqi-Ba'athist order of precedence.

Members

1968–1969

1969–1977

1977

1977–1979

References
General
Membership of the Revolutionary Command Council was taken from this source:
  
Specific

Bibliography

 

.3